The 1942 VFL Grand Final was an Australian rules football game contested between the Essendon Football Club and Richmond Football Club, held at the Princes Park in Melbourne on 19 September 1942. It was the 44th annual Grand Final of the Victorian Football League, staged to determine the premiers for the 1942 VFL season. The match, attended by 49,000 spectators, was won by Essendon by a margin of 53 points, marking that club's seventh premiership victory and first since 1924.

Teams

 Umpire - Eric Hawkins

Statistics

Goalkickers

References
AFL Tables: 1942 Grand Final

See also
 1942 VFL season

VFL/AFL Grand Finals
Grand
Essendon Football Club
Richmond Football Club
VFL Grand Final